State highways in Kentucky are maintained by the Kentucky Transportation Cabinet, which classifies routes as either primary or secondary. Some routes, such as Kentucky Route 80, are both primary and secondary, with only a segment of the route listed as part of the primary system. Despite the name, there is no difference in signage between primary and secondary routes.

All of the Interstates and parkways are also primary, but only parts of the U.S. Highways in Kentucky are (though every mainline U.S. Highway is at least partially primary).

Due to the large size of the state highway system, only segments of routes that are part of the primary system are listed below.

Primary state highways

1-999

1000-1999

2000-2999

3000-5999

6000-6999

References
Kentucky Transportation Cabinet, State Primary Road System Listings, accessed November 2014

 
State